H. L. Lawson & Son Warehouse is a historic warehouse building located at Roanoke, Virginia.  It was built in 1925, and is a four-story, utilitarian brick building.  The banked site allowed for the unloading of freight from railcars directly into the third story of the warehouse.  It was built by Harry Leland Lawson, a key figure in Roanoke's business community from the
late 1910s to the 1940s.

It was listed on the National Register of Historic Places in 2008.

References

Industrial buildings and structures on the National Register of Historic Places in Virginia
Industrial buildings completed in 1925
Buildings and structures in Roanoke, Virginia
National Register of Historic Places in Roanoke, Virginia
Warehouses on the National Register of Historic Places